Walter Benjamín Ponce Gallardo (born 4 March 1998) is a Chilean professional footballer who plays as a forward for Canadian Premier League club Valour FC.

Early life
He played youth football in the system of Spanish club Granada. In 2013, Italian club Udinese, who shared the same owners as Granada, purchased 50% of his economic playing rights.

Club career
He began his senior career with Chilean Primera División club Palestino, making his professional debut in 2015 at age seventeen. He made his debut in a Copa Chile match on 16 July 2015 against Unión Española. Afterwards, he was sent on loan to Spanish club Granada B.

In July 2017, he signed with Universidad de Concepción.

In December 2019, he signed with La Serena for the 2020 season.

In March 2021, he signed with Barnechea in the Primera B de Chile.

In January 2022, he signed with Canadian Premier League club Valour FC. However, due to visa issues, he was unable to join the team until May. He scored his first goal on June 15 against Cavalry FC.

International career
At the 2015 FIFA U-17 World Cup, he made two appearances for Chile U17.

References

External links
 

Chilean footballers
Living people
1998 births
Association football forwards
Footballers from Santiago
Chilean expatriate footballers
Chilean expatriate sportspeople in Spain
Expatriate footballers in Spain
Chilean expatriate sportspeople in Canada
Expatriate soccer players in Canada
Club Deportivo Palestino footballers
Universidad de Concepción footballers
Deportes La Serena footballers
Valour FC players
Chilean Primera División players
Primera B de Chile players
Canadian Premier League players